Trypanophora is a genus of moths of the Zygaenidae family.

Selected species
Trypanophora semihyalina Kollar, 1844

Chalcosiinae
Zygaenidae genera